Pogost is a rural locality (a village) in Pogorelovskoye Rural Settlement, Totemsky District, Vologda Oblast, Russia. The population was 104 as of 2002. There are 3 streets.

Geography 
Pogost is located 56 km southwest of Totma (the district's administrative centre) by road. Pogorelovo is the nearest rural locality.

References 

Rural localities in Tarnogsky District